Kenneth George Chipolina (born 8 April 1994) is a Gibraltarian football player who plays for Manchester 62 and the Gibraltar national football team.

Personal life
He is the younger brother of Joseph Chipolina.

References

External links

1994 births
Living people
Gibraltarian footballers
Gibraltar international footballers
Association football defenders
Gibraltar United F.C. players
Lincoln Red Imps F.C. players
Lions Gibraltar F.C. players
Lynx F.C. players
St Joseph's F.C. players
Gibraltar Premier Division players
Manchester 62 F.C. players